Brindley Robeson Benn (born January 7, 1953) is a Guyanese politician.  He was born in Georgetown, Guyana and is the current minister of home affairs for the government of Guyana.  Benn was appointed minister in August 2020 by President Irfaan Ali. 

His late father, Brindley Benn, was also a government minister and a key leader during the movement for Guyana's Independence.

Education 
Benn is a geologist.  Benn attended college at Graham's Hall, Cummings Lodge and Queen's College. After that, he attended Freiberg University of Mining and Technology where he obtained a degree in geology.

He is married to Dina Sheridan Benn.

Career 
He began his career as a field assistant working for the Guyana Geology and Mines Commission. He was also Chairman-Guyana Geology and Mines Commission. Before his appointment as Minister, he was the Commissioner of the Guyana Geology and Mines Commission.

He was previously a Minister of Public Works.

References 

Living people
1953 births
People from Georgetown, Guyana
Members of the National Assembly (Guyana)
Government ministers of Guyana